François Adrien Juvanon (born 13 August 1875 at  La Balme, now La Balme-les-Grottes, France) was a colonial administrator in various colonies of the French Colonial Empire.

Titles held

References

1875 births
French colonial governors and administrators
Governors of French India
Year of death missing